Seven blessings may refer to:
 Sheva Brachot, series of blessings recited at traditional Jewish weddings
 Seven-Faceted Blessing, a blessing recited in the Jewish liturgy of Friday evenings, related to the Amida